The Lurquin-Coudert was a French automobile manufactured in Paris from 1906 (or 1907) until 1914.  Produced by a maker of industrial engines, they were "voiturette-tricars"; a twin-cylinder ran in the touring class at the 1907 Château-Thierry hillclimb.

In 1911 they produced their first 4-wheeled cyclecar, badged as Coudert. It used a Vee twin 'Train' engine and belt drive until 1912, when a friction plate clutch and chain drive was introduced.

References

 David Burgess Wise, The New Illustrated Encyclopedia of Automobiles

Other sources
Lurquin Coudert profile
Yesterdays. Profile of Lurquin Coudert

External links

3 Wheelers - Lurquin-Coudert - tandem forecar tricycle

Defunct motor vehicle manufacturers of France
Cyclecars